The 2004 Commonwealth of Independent States Cup was the twelfth edition of the competition between the champions of former republics of Soviet Union. It was won by Dinamo Tbilisi for the first time.

Participants

 1 CSKA Moscow were represented by reserve/youth players.
 2 Dynamo Kyiv were represented by a mix of Dynamo-2 and main team players.

Group stage

Group A

Results

Group B

Results

Group C

Results

Group D
Unofficial table

Official table

Results

Final rounds

Quarterfinals

Semifinals

Finals

Top scorers

External links
2004 CIS Cup at rsssf.com
2004 CIS Cup at football.by
2004 CIS Cup at kick-off.by

2004
2004 in Russian football
FC Dynamo Kyiv matches
2003–04 in European football
January 2004 sports events in Russia
2004 in Moscow